Demon Slayer: Kimetsu no Yaiba is a Japanese anime series based on the manga series of the same title, written and illustrated by Koyoharu Gotouge. At the end of the second-season finale, a third season covering the "Swordsmith Village" arc from the manga was announced. It is set to premiere on April 9, 2023, with a one-hour special.

On February 3, 2023, a compilation film, Demon Slayer: Kimetsu no Yaiba – To the Swordsmith Village, which includes the final two episodes of Entertainment District Arc and an advanced screening of the first Swordsmith Village Arc episode, premiered in Japan.

Episode list

Notes

References

2023 Japanese television seasons
Demon Slayer: Kimetsu no Yaiba